The 2007 Four Nations Tournament was the seventh edition of the Four Nations Tournament, an invitational women's football tournament held in China. The venue for this edition of the tournament was Guangdong Olympic Stadium, in the city of Guangzhou.

Teams
Listed were the participating teams.

Venues

Final standings

Match results

References 

2007 in women's association football
2007
2007 in Chinese football
2006–07 in German women's football
2007 United States women's national soccer team
2006–07 in English women's football
January 2007 sports events in Asia
2007 in Chinese women's sport